Gregory Richard Myers (born April 14, 1966) is an American former professional baseball catcher. He played 18 seasons in Major League Baseball (MLB) for the Toronto Blue Jays, California Angels, Minnesota Twins, Atlanta Braves, San Diego Padres, Baltimore Orioles, and Oakland Athletics.

In , Myers was Nolan Ryan's 5,714th — and last — strikeout victim. In , Myers rejuvenated his career with the Blue Jays, returning as a starting catcher. That year, he hit .307, with 15 home runs, and 52 runs batted in (RBI). In , Myers suffered an injury when he slid into second base during a game against the Minnesota Twins at the Metrodome. He was out for the entire year and decided to retire after the  season.

References

External links

1966 births
Living people
American expatriate baseball players in Canada
Atlanta Braves players
Baltimore Orioles players
Baseball players from Riverside, California
California Angels players
Lake Elsinore Storm players
Las Vegas Stars (baseball) players
Major League Baseball catchers
Minnesota Twins players
Oakland Athletics players
Rancho Cucamonga Quakes players
Sacramento River Cats players
San Diego Padres players
Toronto Blue Jays players
Florence Blue Jays players
Knoxville Blue Jays players
Medicine Hat Blue Jays players
Syracuse Chiefs players
Ventura County Gulls players
Riverside Polytechnic High School alumni